Danielithosia limayca is a moth of the family Erebidae. It is found in China (Guangdong).

References

Moths described in 1954
Lithosiina